Nakibinge Kagali was Kabaka (King) of the Kingdom of Buganda, between 1524 and 1554 AD. He was the 8th Kabaka of Buganda.

Claim to the throne
He was the eldest son of Kabaka Kayima Sendikaddiwa, the seventh Kabaka of Buganda, who reigned from 1494 until 1524. Kabaka Nakibinge ascended the throne upon the death of his father in 1524. He established his capital at Bumbu Hill.

During his reign, Nakibinge launched attacks on Bulemezi, which roused the attention of the Omukama of Bunyoro. In the ensuing years, the war raged on, and the heavy attacks of the Banyoro forced Nakibinge to seek military aid from the Islands of Ssesse. However, this boost in military force only guaranteed victory for a brief moment for Nakibinge. 

Despite penetrating further into Bunyoro territory, the Banyoro regrouped and drove Nakibinge's army from Bunyoro. The Banyoro chased his troops through Bulemezi, Kyaddondo and Mawokota.

Married life
He married eight wives:

 Nabitaba, daughter of Ndugwa, of the Lugave clan
 Najjemba, daughter of Semwanga, of the Ngonge clan
 Nalunga, daughter of Lusundo, of the Nvuma clan
 Nabakyaala Namulondo, the Naabagareka, sister of Gunju, of the Butiko clan
 Nasuuna, daughter of Nankere, of the Mamba clan
 Bukirwa, the Nanzigu, daughter of Sekayiba, of the Mbogo clan
 Nannono, daughter of Seggirinya, of the Ngo clan. Nannono acted as regent after the death of her husband for a period of eighteen months
 Kabejja

Issue
He fathered four sons and two daughters:

 Kabaka Mulondo Sekajja, Kabaka of Buganda, whose mother was Namulondo
 Kabaka Jemba Busungwe, Kabaka of Buganda, whose mother was Najjemba
 Kabaka Suuna I Kisolo, Kabaka of Buganda, whose mother was Nassuuna
 Prince (Omulangira) Nzigu, whose mother was Bukirwa
 Princess (Omumbejja) Batenga, whose mother was Namulondo
 Princess (Omumbejja) Nnono, whose mother was Nannono. Born posthumously in 1555. She died young.

The final years
Kabaka Nakibinge was killed in battle against the Banyoro, at Busajja, in 1554. He is buried at Kongojje, Busiro.

According to Buganda historian Semakula Kiwanuka, Nakibinge's death signals the end of the "Babito" dynasty in Buganda, and heralded a new era.

Succession table

See also
 Kabaka of Buganda

References

External links
List of the Kings of Buganda

Kabakas of Buganda
16th-century African people